Eva contro Eva (Italian for Eva against Eva) is the sixth studio album by Italian singer-song-writer Carmen Consoli. It was released in Italy on May 12, 2006, and reached No. 1 in the FIMI Italian Albums Chart, selling about 80,000 copies and gaining platinum status.

The album contains collaborations with Goran Bregovic and Angelique Kidjo, respectively in Il pendio dell'abbandono and Madre Terra. Two singles, Signor Tentenna and Tutto su Eva, were released.

The album was also published in the United States in 2007.

Track listing
 "Tutto su Eva" (All About Eva) – 6:09
 "Maria Catena" – 4:15
 "La dolce attesa" (The Sweet Wait) – 4:18
 "Sulle rive di Morfeo" (On Morfeo's Shores) – 4:35
 "Il pendio dell'abbandono" (The Abandonment's Slope) – 3:18
 "Preghiera in gola" (Prayer in Throat) – 3:54
 "Piccolo Cesare" (Little Cesar) – 4:46
 "Madre Terra" (Mother Earth) – 3:54
 "Signor Tentenna" (Mr. Tentenna) – 4:33
 "Il sorriso di Atlantide" (Atlantis' Smile) – 4:08

References

2006 albums